Australian singer Troye Sivan has released two studio albums, five extended plays, one remix album, one video album, twenty-three singles (including three as featured artist), and ten promotional singles (including one as featured artist). On 15 August 2014, Sivan released his first major-label EP, entitled TRXYE, which peaked at number five on the US Billboard 200. The lead single from the EP, "Happy Little Pill", reached number 10 on the Australian singles chart. On 4 September 2015, Sivan released his second major-label EP, Wild. His debut studio album, Blue Neighbourhood, was released on 4 December 2015. Its first single, "Youth", became Sivan's first single to enter the top 40 of the Billboard Hot 100 chart, peaking at 23 and earned him his first number-one on the Billboard Dance Club Songs chart. His second studio album Bloom (2018) reached number three in Australia and number four on the Billboard 200 chart. Its lead single "My My My!" became Sivan's second number-one on the Dance Club Songs chart.

Albums

Studio albums

Remix albums

Video albums

Extended plays

Singles

As lead artist

As featured artist

Promotional singles

Other charted songs

Other appearances

Songwriting credits

Notes

References

Discographies of Australian artists
Pop music discographies
Discography